Curiapo is a village in the Delta Amacuro, capital of the Antonio Díaz Municipality in Venezuela.

Population 
In 2001 there were some 2880 Warao Indians registered in the parish.

Education 
There are a couple of basic schools in town. Escuela Pedernales is the biggest one.

References
 

Populated places in Delta Amacuro